Pultenaea aspalathoides is a species of flowering plant in the family Fabaceae and is endemic to the south of Western Australia. It is an erect, spindly shrub with hairy, needle-shaped leaves and yellow flowers.

Description
The flowers are uniformly yellow and sessile with hairy bracteoles at the base. Flowering occurs from September to December and the fruit is an oval pod.

Taxonomy and naming
Pultenaea aspalathoides was first formally described in 1844 by Carl Meissner in Lehmann's Plantae Preissianae. The specific epithet (aspalathoides) means "like Aspalathus".

Distribution
This pultenaea grows in the south of Western Australia in the Esperance Plains, Jarrah Forest and Warren biogeographic regions.

Conservation status
Pultenaea aspalathoides is classified as "not threatened" by the Government of Western Australia Department of Parks and Wildlife,

References

aspalathoides
Eudicots of Western Australia
Taxa named by Carl Meissner
Plants described in 1844